Jesus Christ's Horoscope is a 1989 Hungarian drama film directed by Miklós Jancsó. It was entered into the 16th Moscow International Film Festival.

Cast
 Juli Básti as Juli
 György Cserhalmi as Jozef K.
 Ildikó Bánsági as Márta
 Dorottya Udvaros as Kata
 András Bálint as Nyomozó
 László Gálffi as Nyomozó
 András Kozák as Inspector
 Ottilia Borbáth as Matild
 György Fehér as Merse Zoltán

References

External links
 

1989 films
1989 drama films
Hungarian drama films
1980s Hungarian-language films
Films directed by Miklós Jancsó